Bessemer is a southwestern suburb of Birmingham in Jefferson County, Alabama, United States.  The population was 26,019 at the 2020 census. It is within the Birmingham-Hoover, AL Metropolitan Statistical Area, of which Jefferson County is the center. It developed rapidly as an industrial city in the late 19th and early 20th centuries. In 2019, it was named Alabama's "Worst City to Live in" by 24/7 Wall Street.

History
The town was founded in the postbellum era by the Bessemer Land and Improvement Company, named after Henry Bessemer and owned by coal magnate Henry F. DeBardeleben. He had inherited Daniel Pratt's investments. The mayor and councilmen voted to incorporate the city of Bessemer on September 9, 1887. Located 16 miles southwest of Birmingham, Bessemer grew rapidly and its promoters believed that it might overtake the other city in economic power.

Given the iron ore, coal and limestone deposits in the area, the city became a center of steelmaking from about 1890 through the 20th century. It attracted rural migrants from across the South, as well as European immigrants. By the 1950s, the city was majority African American in population.

The industry went through considerable restructuring in the late 20th century, and jobs moved out of the area. Steel is no longer made there.

Geography

Iron ore was mined on the hills on the city's southeast side, coal was (and still is) mined to the north and west, and limestone deposits were also nearby. All three ingredients were necessary for steelmaking, which led to the area becoming a major steel center from about 1890 through the twentieth century. Steel is no longer made within the city limits, but is still manufactured in the neighboring city of Fairfield.

Climate
The climate in this area is characterized by hot, humid summers and generally mild to cool winters.  According to the Köppen Climate Classification system, Bessemer has a humid subtropical climate, abbreviated "Cfa" on climate maps.

Demographics

2020 census

As of the 2020 United States census, there were 26,019 people, 10,492 households, and 6,378 families residing in the city.

2013 ACS
As of the 2013 American Community Survey, there were 27,336 people living in the city. 72.0% were African American, 24.0% White, 0.1% Native American, 0.2% Asian, 0.1% from some other race and 0.4% from two or more races. 3.2% were Hispanic or Latino of any race.

2000 census
As of the census of 2000, there were 29,672 people, 11,537 households, and 7,868 families living in the city. The racial makeup of the city was 69.6% Black or African American, 28.9% White,  0.3% Native American, 0.2% Asian, <0.1% Pacific Islander, 0.3% from other races, and 0.7% from two or more races. 1.1% of the population were Hispanic or Latino of any race.

There were 11,537 households, out of which 30.5% had children under the age of 18 living with them, 34.6% were married couples living together, 29.2% had a female householder with no husband present, and 31.8% were non-families. 29.0% of all households were made up of individuals, and 13.0% had someone living alone who was 65 years of age or older. The average household size was 2.52 and the average family size was 3.12.

In the city, the population was spread out, with 26.8% under the age of 18, 9.6% from 18 to 24, 26.1% from 25 to 44, 21.1% from 45 to 64, and 16.4% who were 65 years of age or older. The median age was 36 years. For every 100 females, there were 82.9 males. For every 100 females age 18 and over, there were 75.8 males.

The median income for a household in the city was $23,066, and the median income for a family was $28,230. Males had a median income of $29,413 versus $21,552 for females. The per capita income for the city was $12,232. About 24.2% of families and 27.2% of the population were below the poverty line, including 37.8% of those under age 18 and 24.7% of those age 65 or over.

Economy

In 1900, Bessemer ranked eighth in population in the state, second in amount of capital invested in manufacturing, and fourth in the value of its manufactured product for the year. By 1911, ore mining, iron smelting, and the manufacture of iron and coke were the chief industries of Bessemer.  Truck farming was also an important industry, dating from the area's agricultural past.

Both blacks and whites from rural areas were attracted to the city for its new work opportunities. Gradually African Americans moved into industrial jobs and became part of integrated unions; such jobs enabled many working-class families to enjoy middle-class incomes.

Today, ore mining has ended, as supplies were exhausted. Manufacturing remains a factor, with the U.S. Pipe and Foundry ductile pipe plant on the city's north side. On May 9, 2007, U.S. Pipe announced that it would be building a new $45-million foundry near the current plant.  The site was selected, among other reasons, for having available space for potential future expansions. U.S. Pipe is the largest domestic producer of Ductile Iron pipe in sizes 4 inch through 64 inch.

The city was once home to a large railroad car manufacturing factory, operated by Pullman Standard for many decades and later by Trinity Industries. With railroad restructuring in the late 20th century and other manufacturing moving offshore, this plant ceased most production in the 1990s. In 2012, BLOX LLC (bloxbuilt.com) a manufacturer of modular components for healthcare facilities moved into this facility.

The decline of mining and exodus of the steelmaking and railcar manufacturing industries resulted in extensive loss of jobs. The city has lost population since a peak in 1970. It faced an economic crisis in the early to mid-1980s, as unemployed workers constituted more than one-third of the workforce. Since that time the city, through the efforts of the Bessemer Area Chamber of Commerce and the Bessemer Industrial Development Board, has been successful in diversifying its economy. It is recognized for its business growth.  In June 2018,  Amazon announced that it would build a new , $325 million fulfillment center in Bessemer which will initially create 1,500 new jobs.

Crime increased following the rise in unemployment and social disruption from the decline of manufacturing industries in the area. As of 2019, Bessemer ranks first in terms of violent crimes for U.S. cities with 25,000 or more people.

Arts and culture
The performance center Bessemer Civic Center provides multiple performance spaces for music and theatre.

Government
Bessemer uses the mayor–city council form of government. The council has seven members, elected from single-member districts. As of 2016, Kenneth Gulley is mayor, a position elected at-large. He was first elected in 2010 and reelected to a second term in 2014.

A satellite Jefferson County courthouse is located in downtown Bessemer. There is a special county government district, known as the "Bessemer Cutoff", which was established in the middle of the 20th century when Bessemer was a major city in its own right. A separate county government was considered a possibility, but there was not sufficient land area to meet legislative requirements for a county. The "Cutoff" had a separate series of Alabama license plates, with a different numeric prefix than the rest of the county.

Bessemer has since been surpassed in size by Birmingham suburbs such as Hoover. But Bessemer retains the branch county courthouse to this day. The term "Bessemer Cutoff" continues to be used regularly by area residents.

The United States Postal Service operates the Bessemer Post Office.

The state Alabama Department of Corrections operates the William E. Donaldson Correctional Facility, a prison for men, in unincorporated Jefferson County, Alabama, near Bessemer. The prison includes one of the two Alabama death rows for men.

Education

Public schools
Bessemer has its own school system independent of Jefferson County schools, Bessemer City School District.  The system includes:
 Hard Elementary
 Jonesboro Elementary
 Greenwood Elementary
 Abrams Elementary
 Westhills Elementary
 Bessemer City Middle
 Bessemer City High School (formally Jess Lanier)

The Board of Education also operates the Quitman Mitchell Opportunity Center, which includes an adult learning center, Even Start child care center, and New Horizon Alternative School.

Private schools
K–12 private schools in the Bessemer include Rock Christian School and Bessemer Academy, which was founded as a segregation academy.

Community college
Lawson State Community College operates the former Bessemer Technical College campus. The two schools merged in 2005 as a cost-saving measure.

Media
The Western Star is a weekly newspaper which covers Bessemer and nearby communities.

The Birmingham News is published three days per week, and also publishes a weekly section devoted to news from Bessemer and nearby communities.

One radio station, WZGX (1450 AM), operates within the city; it broadcasts some Spanish programming and music to appeal to the growing Mexican-American population of Jefferson County. It also continues a tradition of broadcasting high school football games on Friday nights. All of metro Birmingham's stations are heard in Bessemer, as well as several stations broadcasting from Tuscaloosa.

Television station WDBB (channel 17) is licensed to Bessemer, but broadcasts from studios in Birmingham, simulcasting with WTTO (channel 21). All of Birmingham's television stations may be viewed in Bessemer, and some have established news bureaus there.

Infrastructure

Transportation
In 1911, the town was served by five railroad lines: Alabama Great Southern (Queen & Crescent route), the Louisville & Nashville Railroad, the Kansas City, Memphis & Birmingham (St. Louis & San Francisco Railroad system), the Birmingham Southern Railroad, and the Atlanta, Birmingham & Atlantic railways. Passenger service decreased after people started choosing to travel by automobiles, increasingly so after World War II. In addition, there was widespread restructuring in the railroad industry that also applied to freight lines.

By 2006, the companies noted above had consolidated to CSX Transportation, which has lines to Birmingham and Brookwood; and the Norfolk Southern Railway, with lines to Birmingham, Mobile and New Orleans; Birmingham Southern continues in service. A major railroad feature is the "High Line", constructed by Tennessee Coal & Iron (predecessor to U.S. Steel) to ship iron ore from the mines on the city's south side to the steel works in nearby Fairfield. This elevated line traverses the eastern side of the city. Though tracks were removed over much of the High Line when the mines closed, part of the line is still used by the Birmingham Southern. All of the roadbed and bridges remain in place.

Bessemer is served by the small Bessemer Airport to the southeast of the city.

Major highways in Bessemer include I-20/59, I-459, U.S. Route 11, and State Route 150, which connects Bessemer with Hoover.

Notable people
 Neil Bonnett, NASCAR driver
 McKinley Boykin, professional football player
 Alex Bradford, composer, singer, arranger, and choir director
 Mildred Brown, journalist
 David L. DeJarnette, archaeologist, generally considered the "Father of Alabama Archaeology"
 Thornton Dial, African-American folk artist
 Nelsan Ellis, actor and playwright
 Anthony Henton, former NFL linebacker
 Mike Hill, Broadcaster, ESPN/Fox Sports and other national outlets
 Virginia Hill, actress, mob courier and girlfriend of Bugsy Siegel
 Andre Holland, actor
 Frank House, born in Bessemer, major league baseball player
 Bo Jackson, Heisman Trophy winner, NFL and MLB player
 Lamar Johnson, former MLB first baseman
 Eddie LeVert, singer
 Gucci Mane, rapper
 Reese McCall, former NFL tight end
 David McCampbell, naval aviator, Medal of Honor recipient, and the US Navy's all-time leading ace with 34 aerial victories during World War II.
 Edward McClain, Alabama state legislator
 Deborah E. McDowell, English professor and author of a 1997 memoir of life in Bessemer, Leaving Pipe Shop
 Elijah Nevett, NFL player
 Kerry Rhodes, NFL player
 DeMeco Ryans, NFL player
 Glenn Shadix, born in Bessemer, actor
 John Paul Thomas, artist, educator and scholar; born in Bessemer
 Olanda Truitt, NFL player
 Larry Watkins, former NFL running back
 Jack Whitten, abstract painter
 Andre Williams, singer and producer
 Gran Wilson, opera singer
 Rod Windsor, NFL player
 Jameis Winston, Heisman Trophy winner, Quarterback for the New Orleans Saints

Notable animals
 Matilda (chicken), Guinness World Record holder

See also

 SS Bessemer Victory – World War II cargo ship named for Bessemer
 Bessemer union drive - unionization movement of workers at Amazon

References

External links

 
 Bessemer Area Chamber of Commerce

 
1887 establishments in Alabama
Birmingham metropolitan area, Alabama
Cities in Alabama
Cities in Jefferson County, Alabama
Populated places established in 1887